London is the capital of and largest city in England and the United Kingdom. It is administered by the Greater London Authority, City of London Corporation and 32 London boroughs. These boroughs are modern, having been created in 1965 and have a weaker sense of identity than their constituent "districts" (considered in speech, "parts of London" or more formally, "areas"). Two major factors have shaped the development of London district and sub-district identities; the ancient parish – which was used for both civil and ecclesiastical functions – and the pre-urban settlement pattern.

Ancient parishes and their successors
The modern London boroughs were primarily formed from amalgamations of Metropolitan, County and Municipal Boroughs. 
These were formed from ancient parishes (or groupings of them), with ancient parishes in turn generally based on a single manor, though many were based on more than one and a few manors were so large that they were divided into multiple parishes. 

An early form of the Parish system was, in England, long established by the time of the Conquest, and had fully matured by the 12th century. By this time, changes in Canon Law made boundary changes and sub-divisions very difficult. There were occasional sub-divisions, but boundary changes were extremely unusual. From the time of Henry VIII, parishes took on the civil role previously held by manors, thus these areas fulfilled both civil and ecclesiastical roles.

From the nineteenth century, there was a divergence between civil and ecclesiastic functions, and the ancient parishes gained a Civil Parish counterpart in almost all instances. Ecclesiastic parishes sub-divided to a great extent, to better serve the needs of a growing population, while civil parishes persisted on the same basis until 1900.

Thus the parish system was the smallest unit of English administration that had any kind of defined boundary, it also provided great continuity as the basis of local identities. 

The capital had three ancient boroughs of London, Southwark and Kingston upon Thames.

Pre-urban settlement pattern
Apart from the ancient parishes, the second major influence on the districts of London are the pre-urban settlement patterns. The lowlands of England are made up of two very distinct landscape types, this is comparable to the division of lowland France into bocage and champagne types. The landscape of the countryside around London – in Middlesex, Essex, Surrey and Kent was characterised by a sometimes dense, but highly dispersed population, in scattered farmsteads and tiny hamlets. 

This pattern contrasts in this way, and a number of others, to the large 'village' (larger nucleated agricultural settlements) based communities associated with the former open-field landscapes of the midlands and elsewhere. The landscape historian Oliver Rackham called the type around London, the Ancient Landscape and the midland type the Planned Landscape. Other writers use different terms for the same pattern.

Apart from a large number of very small settlements, another major feature of the Ancient Landscape around London, when compared to the Midlands, is the relatively large number of woods and commons, with many of the latter being preserved as parks, some of which give their name to sub-districts (e.g. Finsbury Park in Islington). Towns (settlements like Uxbridge and Romford) with chartered markets and the trades attracted by this privilege, were infrequent.

The rural settlement pattern provided much of the initial framework on which the subsequent urbanisation was based. A significant result of the dispersed settlement pattern was to reinforce the ancient parish unit in shaping local identity.

Sub-districts
Sub-districts of the districts rooted in parishes are of five types. The development of these has been heavily influenced by the historic landscape characteristics of the London area:  
former hamlets, in all but the greenest fringes of London these grew and merged into neighbouring settlements, have rarely been assigned formal or customary boundaries. Therefore, perceptions of their extent are informal. 
former manors, where the last extent of these has been carved up into consistent zones, "schemes" of one or more housing, or another type of development. In various parts of the city, their identities may be: forgotten, fading, partly reviving, or well-preserved such as in business/green/retail parks or conservation areas.  In most cases, the central manor house area, the demesne of the manor has kept a named identity or replaced by an eponymous street name.
estates more recently in single ownership or set out as a large planned area, later than manors, in many cases such as Belgravia, Fitzrovia, Canning Town, Nine Elms, these have a strong, coherent, identity and are usually internally homogenous or similar in architectural style.
feature-named districts based on the name of a local station (rail, tram or tube) or other features such as a monument or notable coaching inn name, such as Nags Head, Holloway, a double instance of this
geographic suffixes and prefixes (such as South Croydon, East Finchley and Woodford Green).

Other use of place names
For electoral purposes, all boroughs are divided into wards which may share the names of London districts, drawn to have equal head of voting population (electorate) they depart from true historic and building scheme boundaries and are redrawn every 8–12 years.
 
London postcode districts often have an influence over residents' and businesses' self-identity. They were not designed for this purpose. Some areas are now interchangeable (e.g. Brondesbury and Kilburn, which share a grid reference in the table), with the greatest overlap such as this in areas where differently named stations in the public transit system almost overlap.

The northernmost settlement is Crews Hill, Enfield – westernmost is Harefield, Hillingdon – southernmost is Old Coulsdon, Croydon – easternmost as well as most outlying overall is North Ockendon, Havering.

List of districts and neighbourhoods of London

See also

List of highest places in Greater London
London Plan, as drawn and redrawn regularly, particularly as to Major Hubs.
List of wards in Greater London
Museum Mile, London

References

Footnotes

Bibliography

 
 
 Districts
London (Districts)